is a former speed skater from Japan, who represented his native country in four consecutive Winter Olympics, starting in 1988 in Calgary, Alberta, Canada.

References

External links

1968 births
Japanese male speed skaters
Speed skaters at the 1988 Winter Olympics
Speed skaters at the 1992 Winter Olympics
Speed skaters at the 1994 Winter Olympics
Speed skaters at the 1998 Winter Olympics
Olympic speed skaters of Japan
Speed skaters at the 1990 Asian Winter Games
Medalists at the 1990 Asian Winter Games
Asian Games medalists in speed skating
Asian Games silver medalists for Japan
Asian Games bronze medalists for Japan
Universiade medalists in speed skating
Nippon Sport Science University alumni
People from Kushiro, Hokkaido
Living people
Universiade bronze medalists for Austria
Competitors at the 1991 Winter Universiade